Eucalyptus pulverulenta, commonly known as silver-leaved mountain gum,<ref name="ABRS">{{cite web |last1=Chippendale |first1=George M. |title=Eucalyptus pulverulanta |url=https://profiles.ala.org.au/opus/foa/profile/Eucalyptus%20pulverulenta |publisher=Australian Biological Resources Study, Department of the Environment and Energy, Canberra |access-date=7 December 2019}}</ref> is a species of straggly tree or mallee that is endemic to southern New South Wales. It has smooth bark, egg-shaped, heart-shaped or round, sessile leaves arranged in opposite pairs, flower buds in groups of three, white flowers and cup-shaped to cylindrical fruit.

It has smooth, greenish to grey or brown bark, sometimes hanging in short ribbons. Flowering occurs from May to November and the flowers are white.

TaxonomyEucalyptus pulverulenta was first formally described in 1819 by John Sims in the Botanical Magazine. The specific epithet (pulverulenta) is from the Latin word pulveratus meaning "powdered", referring to the white covering on the leaves, buds and fruit.

Distribution and habitat
Silver-leaved mountain gum is only known from a few scattered populations on the Central and Southern Tablelands of New South Wales, between Bathurst and Bombala. It grows in grassy woodland on hillsides and mountains.

Conservation status
This eucalypt is classified as "vulnerable" under the Australian Government Environment Protection and Biodiversity Conservation Act 1999. It was only known from about 5,400 plant in ten populations in 1990. The main threats to the species are habitat damage due to grazing, clearing of vegetation for fire trail, and its small population size.

Use in horticulture
A cultivar known as 'Baby Blue' is a dwarf form of E. pulverulenta''.

See also 
List of Eucalyptus species

References 

Myrtales of Australia
pulverulenta
Flora of New South Wales
Mallees (habit)
Plants described in 1819